De Wahl's rule is a rule of word formation, developed by Baltic German naval officer and teacher Edgar de Wahl and applied in the constructed language Interlingue, which was also his creation.

The rule served for the formation of certain changed grammatical forms, like adjectives and nouns, from verb infinitive.

Edgar de Wahl observed existing patterns of sound changes that occurred in natural languages (d to s, r to t, etc). The purpose of his rule was to distill these patterns into a regular and logical system that is reproducible yet also natural in appearance.

Rule

Verb infinitives in Interlingue end in -ar, -ir or -er. The root is obtained by the following way:
 If, after the removal of -r or -er of the infinitive, the root ends in a vowel, the final -t is added: crea/r, crea/t-, crea/t/or; peti/r, peti/t-, peti/t/ion.
 If the root ends in consonants d or r, they are changed into s: decid/er, deci/s-, deci/s/ion; adher/er, adhe/s, adhe/sion; elid/er, eli/s-, eli/s/ion.
 In all other cases, with six exceptions, the removal of the ending gives the exact root: duct/er, duct-, duct/ion; emiss/er, emiss-, emiss/ion.

These six exceptions are
 ced/er, cess-
 sed/er, sess-
 mov/er, mot-
 ten/er, tent-
 vert/er, vers-
 veni/r, vent-
and the verbs formed out of them using prefixes.

Because the rule is actually made of three parts, it also known as the "three rules of de Wahl".

The nouns and adjectives are created by removing the ending and thus obtaining the root. After adding -r or -er, one obtains the infinitive in the majority of cases: decora/t/ion, decora/t-, decora/r.

Application
This rule is used in the constructed languages Interlingue and Sambahsa. After a possible modification one can apply this rule to create new forms of a word especially in Romance languages or in languages which borrowed vocabulary from Romance languages.

References

External links
  Henry Jacob, The Preparatory Work for an International Technical Terminology reprint of The British Steelmaker, December 1945
 Henry Jacob, Occidental (1922) by Edgar de Wahl
 De Wahl's rule

Constructed languages
International auxiliary languages